Mind Over Motor is a 1923 American silent comedy film directed by Ward Lascelle and starring Trixie Friganza, Ralph Graves and Clara Horton.

Cast
 Trixie Friganza as Tish 
 Ralph Graves as Jasper McCutcheon 
 Clara Horton as Bettina Bailey 
 Lucy Handforth as Lizzie 
 Caroline Rankin as Aggie 
 Grace Gordon as Marie 
 Pietro Sosso as Officer 
 George Guyton as Gardiner 
 Mrs. Lee as Mother 
 Larry Steers as Ellis 
 Edward Hearn as Starter

References

Bibliography
 Goble, Alan. The Complete Index to Literary Sources in Film. Walter de Gruyter, 1999.

External links
 

1923 films
1923 comedy films
1920s English-language films
American silent feature films
Silent American comedy films
Films directed by Ward Lascelle
American black-and-white films
1920s American films